Matthew Robin Trevor (born 1 September 1982) is an English cricketer.  Trevor is a right-handed batsman who bowls right-arm fast-medium.  He was born in Leicester, Leicestershire.

Mackey represented the Leicestershire Cricket Board in 2 List A matches against Denmark in the 1st round of the 2003 Cheltenham & Gloucester Trophy, and the Kent Cricket Board in the 2nd round of the same competition.  Both matches were held in 2002.  In his 2 List A matches, he scored 2 runs.

In currently plays club cricket for Market Harborough Cricket Club in the Leicestershire Premier Cricket League.

References

External links
Matthew Trevor at Cricinfo
Matthew Trevor at CricketArchive

1982 births
Living people
Cricketers from Leicester
English cricketers
Leicestershire Cricket Board cricketers